A Waterford City and County Council election was held in County Waterford and Waterford City in Ireland on 24 May 2019 as part of that year's local elections. All 32 councillors were elected for a five-year term of office from 6 local electoral areas (LEAs) by single transferable vote.

The 2018 boundary review committee recommended significant changes to the LEAs in the 2014 elections due to terms of references requiring a maximum of seven councillors in each LEA and changes in population revealed in the 2016 census. These changes were adopted by statutory instrument (S.I.) No. 635/2018.

Voters in Waterford also took part in a plebiscite on whether or not to establish the position of a directly elected mayor for the council under the Local Government Act 2019. The proposal was rejected by a narrow margin of 50.8% No to 49.2% Yes. Two other council also held plebiscites on directly elected mayors: Cork City rejected the proposal, and Limerick was the only one of the three to vote Yes.

Results by party

Results by local electoral area

Dungarvan

Lismore

Portlaw–Kilmacthomas

Tramore–Waterford City West

Waterford City East

Waterford City South

Results by gender

Plebiscite

Changes since 2019 local elections
† Tramore & Waterford City West Green Party Cllr Marc Ó Cathasaigh was elected to the Dáil in the 2020 general election as a Teachta Dála (TD) for the Waterford constituency. Laura Swift was co-opted to fill the vacancy on 26 February 2020. However, she subsequently resigned on 6 May citing conflict with her role in the Family Mediation Service. Following this resignation, Susan Gallagher was co-opted on 24 June 2020 to the Green Party seat in Tramore & Waterford City West.
†† Waterford City East Independent Cllr Matt Shanahan was elected to the Dáil in the 2020 general election as a TD for the Waterford constituency. Former Cllr Mary Roche was co-opted to fill the vacancy on 26 February 2020
††† Waterford City South Fine Gael Cllr John Cummins was elected to Seanad Éireann at the 2020 Seanad election, on the Labour Panel. On 24 June 2020, Frank Quinlan was co-opted to fill the vacancy.

Footnotes

Sources

References

2019 Irish local elections
2019